Sergei Mikhailovich Slonimsky (12 August 1932 – 9 February 2020) was a Russian and Soviet composer, pianist and musicologist.

Biography
He was the son of the Soviet writer Mikhail Slonimsky and nephew of the Russian-American composer Nicolas Slonimsky. He studied at the Musical College in Moscow from 1943 until 1950. From 1950 Slonimsky was at the Leningrad Conservatory. He studied composition under Boris Arapov, Vissarion Shebalin and Orest Yevlakhov, polyphony under Nicolai Uspensky and piano under Anna Artobolevskaya, Samari Savshinsky and Vladimir Nielsen. Slonimsky was a professor at the St. Petersburg Conservatory.  While the majority of his students were Russian, Slonimsky taught a large percentage of the international composition students at the Conservatory from countries including: Colombia, Korea, China, Italy, Germany, Israel, Iran and the United States.

Among Slonimsky's notable students is Daniel Kidane.

Slonimsky died in Saint Petersburg on 9 February 2020 after a long illness.

Music and style
Sergei Slonimsky composed more than a hundred pieces: 5 operas, 2 ballets, 34 symphonies and works in all genres of chamber, vocal, choral, theatre and cinema music, including Pesn' Volnitsy (The Songs of Freedom,  for mezzo-soprano, baritone and symphony orchestra based on Russian folk songs, 1962), A Voice from the Chorus, a cantata set to poems by Alexander Blok, Concerto-Buffo, Piano Concerto (Jewish Rhapsody), Cello Concerto, 24 preludes and fugues, etc.

Mostly eclectic, he experimented with a folkloric style as well as with 12-tone techniques and new forms of notations. He also used forms and styles of jazz and neo-romantic music.

Operas
Virinea, an opera in 7 scenes. Libretto by S. Tsenin after the novel by Lidiia Seifullina (1967)
Ioann the Terrible's vision Russian tragedy in 13 visions with 3 epilogues and overture. Libretto by Ya. Gordin after historical documents (1970)
Tsar Iksion monodical drama after ancient myth and tragedy by Innokenty Annensky. Libretto by S. Slonimsky (1970) premiered January 31, 1981, Kuibyshev.
Mary Stuart, a ballad opera in 3 acts. Libretto by Y. Gordin after the novel by Stefan Zweig  (1980)
Master and Margarita, a chamber opera in 3 acts. Libretto by Y. Dimitrin and V. Fialkovsky after the novel by Mikhail Bulgakov (1970), (1985) 25'
Hamlet, dramma per musica in 3 acts. Libretto by Ya. Gordin and S. Slonimsky after Shakespeare's tragedy translated by Boris Pasternak,  (1990)

Ballets
Ikarus, a ballet in 3 acts. Libretto by Y. Slonimsky after an ancient Greek myth (1971)
Magic nut, ballet, libretto by Michael Shemjakin, 2005, premiere May 14, 2005, Mariinsky Theatre

Selected filmography
 The Republic of ShKID (1966)
 The Mysterious Wall (1967)
 Summer Impressions of Planet Z (1986)
 Tomorrow Was the War (1987)

References

Further reading
Grove Music Online, Slonimsky, Sergey Mikhaylovich, article by Larisa Danko.
G.  Abramovsky: ‘Simfoniya Sergeya Slonimskogo’, Sovetskaya simfon iya za 50 let, ed. G.  Tigranov (Leningrad, 1967), 336–43
D.  Pabinovich and others: ‘Na obsuzhdenii “Virinei” S. Slonimskogo’ [In discussion of Slonimsky’s ‘Vireniya’], SovM (1968), no.4, pp. 31–46 [incl. contribution by Slonimsky, 43–4]
V.  Smirnov: ‘“Virineya” S. Slonimskogo’, Voprosï teorii i ėstetiki muzïki, ed. L.  Raaben, xi (Leningrad, 1972), 50–67
A.  Stratiyevsky: ‘Kantata S. Slonimskogo “Golos iz khora”’, Blok i muzïka, ed. M.A.  Elik (Leningrad and Moscow, 1972), 229–45
L.  Rappoport: ‘Nekotorïye stilevïye osobennosti muzïki S. Slonimskogo i yego baleta “Ikar”’ [Certain particular stylistic features of the music of Slonimsky and of his ballet ‘Icarus’], Muzïka i zhizn′, ii (1973), 80–97
Ye.  Ruch′yevskaya: ‘O metodakh pretvoreniya i vïrazitel′nom znachenii rechevoy intonatsii, na primere tvorchestva S. Slonimskogo’ [On the methods of realization and the expressive significance of speech intonation, with examples from the work of Slonimsky], Poėziya i muzïka, ed. V.  Frumkin (Moscow, 1973), 137–85
A.  Milka: Sergey Slonimsky, monograficheskiy ocherk [Slonimsky, a monographic sketch] (Leningrad and Moscow, 1976)
A.  Klimovitsky: ‘Opernoye tvorchestvo Sergeya Slonimskogo’ [The operatic work of Slonimsky], Sovremennaya sovetskaya opera, ed. A.L.  Porfir′yeva (Leningrad, 1985), 24–59
M.  Rïtsareva: Kompozitor Sergey Slonimsky, monografiya (Leningrad, 1991)
L.N.  Raaben: O dukhovnom renessanse v russkoy muzïke 1960–80kh godov [About the spiritual renaissance of Russian music during the 1960s–80s] (St Petersburg, 1998)

External links
Official Site of composer Sergei Slonimsky | Saint Petersburg Contemporary Music Center reMusik.org
Interview with Sergei Slonimsky | reMusik.org Journal
Composer's home page
Ovar's Russian collection

1932 births
2020 deaths
Russian Jews
Jewish classical composers
Russian male classical composers
Soviet classical composers
Soviet male classical composers
Russian opera composers
Male opera composers
Academic staff of Saint Petersburg Conservatory
Saint Petersburg Conservatory alumni
20th-century Russian male musicians